WSMH (channel 66), branded on-air as Fox 66, is a television station licensed to Flint, Michigan, United States, serving as the Fox affiliate for northeastern Michigan. It is owned by Sinclair Broadcast Group, which provides certain services to Saginaw-licensed NBC affiliate WEYI-TV (channel 25, owned by Howard Stirk Holdings) and Bay City-licensed CW affiliate WBSF (channel 46, owned by Cunningham Broadcasting) through separate shared services agreements (SSAs). However, Sinclair effectively owns WBSF as the majority of Cunningham's stock is owned by the family of deceased group founder Julian Smith.

The three stations share studios on West Pierson Road in Mount Morris Township (with a Flint mailing address); WSMH's transmitter is located on Amman Road (near Gary Road) near St. Charles, Michigan. There is no separate website for WSMH; instead, it is integrated with that of sister station WEYI-TV.

History
Flint Broadcasting Limited Partnership requested a station with the call letters WSMH, which were assigned on September 27, 1984. WSMH first went on the air on January 13, 1985 as an independent station with Frederick (Fritz) Mills as general manager. Mills was formerly director of national sales, UPI Media in Chicago. A fire at the transmitter in April 1985 forced the station to go off the air for about one month until repairs could be made. Flint Broadcasting sold the station to Gerald J. Robinson by July 1986. On October 9, 1986, it became a charter Fox affiliate. Sinclair Broadcast Group bought the station in 1996.

Per a new five-year affiliation agreement reached between Sinclair and Fox on May 15, 2012, WSMH would remain a Fox affiliate until at least December 31, 2017, although currently, its Fox affiliation remains to this day.

Programming

Syndicated programming
Syndicated programming on WSMH includes Judge Jerry, The People's Court, Family Feud, The Big Bang Theory, and The Goldbergs, among others.

News operation

As of December 2021, WSMH presently broadcasts 16½ hours of locally produced newscast each week (with 3 hours each weekday, 30 minutes on Saturdays, and an hour on Sundays).

On October 28, 2002, WSMH started up a news department and began airing local broadcasts every night at 10. Called Fox 66 News at 10, it was assisted by Sinclair's centralized news department under the News Central brand. Local news originated from WSMH's studios while national news, weather, and sports aired from News Central headquarters in Hunt Valley, Maryland. The station was the first Sinclair-owned property to use the News Central service and marked the first time it had ventured into the local news market. In January 2006, Sinclair announced plans to end its News Central operation due to low ratings and expense.

On April 10, Sinclair announced that CBS affiliate WNEM-TV would begin producing a nightly 10 o'clock show on WSMH known as TV 5 News at 10 on Fox 66. This began airing on April 24 from WNEM's studios on North Franklin Street in Downtown Saginaw. After the final News Central broadcast on April 21, many local WSMH news employees were laid off. It had been expected that some personalities would join the WNEM-produced newscast in the future according to a press release. This was the case for former WSMH reporter David Custer who joined the WNEM news team on May 3.

The final News Central broadcast featured, in its last few minutes, clips from past shows. At the end, the studio was darkened and Jim Kiertzner and his boss left for the last time. Even after WSMH shut down its news operation, Mark E. Hyman's controversial "The Point" editorials continued to air following the end of the WNEM-produced newscasts. Hyman ended his commentaries on November 30. On May 1, 2009, the 10 o'clock news title was re-branded and the broadcast received updated graphics. Every night at 10:45, a fifteen-minute sports highlight show called Sports Extra airs. There is also a segment called "Fugitive Files" airing every week on Mondays which is a common segment offered by local news departments operated by Sinclair. Although WNEM upgraded its newscasts to 16:9 enhanced definition widescreen on October 14, 2010, the newscasts on WSMH remain in pillarboxed 4:3 standard definition because this channel lacks a modern master control facility at its separate studios to receive the newscast in widescreen.

Effective April 27, 2015, WEYI took over duties of producing the 10 p.m. newscast for sister Sinclair station WSMH, Fox 66 News at 10. Prior to April 27, WNEM-TV produced WSMH's evening newscast as part of a local agreement with WSMH. Full Measure with Sharyl Attkisson, a Sinclair Broadcast Group produced half-hour investigative news program, airs on the channel on Sunday morning starting October 4, 2015.

Technical information

Subchannels
The station's digital signal is multiplexed:

On September 30, 2006, WSMH began broadcasting The Tube on its secondary subchannel.

In late 2010 and early 2011 with new carriage deals by owner Sinclair, WSMH added two music video networks to its digital subchannels, TheCoolTV on 66.2 and The Country Network on 66.3.

In late August 2012, TheCoolTV was dropped from all 32 Sinclair stations that carried the channel, including WSMH, with no replacement due to non-renewal of affiliation. Sinclair signed an agreement in June 2014 which added GetTV to 33 TV markets with WSMH adding that channel on channel 66.2 effective July 2.

Zuus was replaced on WSMH-DT3 by Comet on October 31, 2015. In December of that year, the station replaced GetTV with Antenna TV.

Analog-to-digital conversion 
WSMH discontinued regular programming on its analog signal, over UHF channel 66, on May 21, 2009. The station's digital signal remained on its pre-transition UHF channel 16, using PSIP to display the station's virtual channel as its former UHF analog channel 66, which was among the high band UHF channels (52-69) that were removed from broadcasting use as a result of the transition.

See also
Channel 16 digital TV stations in the United States
Channel 66 virtual TV stations in the United States

References

External links

Fox network affiliates
Antenna TV affiliates
Comet (TV network) affiliates
Stadium (sports network) affiliates
Sinclair Broadcast Group
SMH
Television channels and stations established in 1984
1984 establishments in Michigan